The East of England is one of the nine official regions of England. This region was created in 1994 and was adopted for statistics purposes from 1999. It includes the ceremonial counties of Bedfordshire, Cambridgeshire, Essex, Hertfordshire, Norfolk and Suffolk. Essex has the highest population in the region.

The population of the East of England region in 2018 was 6.24 million. Bedford, Luton, Basildon, Peterborough, Southend-on-Sea, Norwich, Ipswich, Colchester, Chelmsford and Cambridge are the region's most populous settlements. The southern part of the region lies in the London commuter belt.

Geography

The East of England region has the lowest elevation range in the UK. Twenty percent of the region is below mean sea level, most of this in North Cambridgeshire, Norfolk and on the Essex Coast. Most of the remaining area is of low elevation, with extensive glacial deposits. The Fens, a large area of reclaimed marshland, are mostly in North Cambridgeshire. The Fens include the lowest point in the country in the village of Holme: 2.75 metres (9.0 ft) below mean sea level. This area formerly included the body of open water known as Whittlesey Mere. The highest point in the region is at Clipper Down at 817 ft (249 m) above mean sea level, in the far southwestern corner of the region in the Ivinghoe Hills.

Communities known as New Towns, responses to urban congestion and World War II destruction, appeared in Basildon and Harlow (Essex), as well as in Stevenage and Hemel Hempstead (Hertfordshire), in the 1950s and 1960s. In the late 1960s, the Roskill Commission considered Cublington in Buckinghamshire, Thurleigh in Bedfordshire, Nuthampstead in Hertfordshire and Foulness in Essex as locations for a possible third airport for London. A new airport was not built, but a former Royal Air Force base at Stansted, which had previously been converted to civilian use redeveloped and expanded in the following decades.

Historical use

The East of England succeeded the standard statistical region East Anglia (which excluded Essex, Hertfordshire and Bedfordshire, then in the South East). The East of England civil defence region was identical to today's region.

East Anglia with Home Counties
Essex, despite meaning East-Saxons, previously formed part of South East England, along with Bedfordshire and Hertfordshire, a mixture of definite and debatable Home counties. The earliest use of the term is from 1695. Charles Davenant, in An essay upon ways and means of supplying the war, wrote, "The Eleven Home Counties, which are thought in Land Taxes to pay more than their proportion..." then cited a list including these four. The term does not appear to have been used in taxation since the 18th century.

Historic counties

The historic counties ceased to be used for any administrative purpose in 1899 but remain important to some people, notably for county cricket.

Climate
The area receives such low rainfall amounts because low pressure systems and weather fronts from the Atlantic lose a lot of moisture over land (and therefore are usually much weaker) by the time they reach Eastern England.

Winter (mid-November – mid-March) is mostly cool, but non-prevailing cold easterly winds can affect the area from the continent. These can bring heavy snowfall if the winds interact with a low-pressure system over the Atlantic or France. Northerly winds also can be cold but are not usually as cold as easterly winds. Westerly winds bring milder and, typically, wetter weather. Southerly winds usually bring mild air (if from the Atlantic or North Africa) but chill if coming from further east than Spain.

Spring (mid-March – May) is a transitional season that initially can be chilly but is usually warm by late-April/May. The weather at this time is often changeable (within each day) and occasionally showery.

Summer (June – mid-September) is usually warm. Continental air from mainland Europe or the Azores High usually leads to at least a few weeks of hot, balmy weather with prolonged warm to hot temperatures. The number of summer storms from the Atlantic, such as the remnants of a tropical storm, usually coincides with the location of the jet stream. The East tends to receive much less rain than the other regions.

Autumn (mid-September – mid-November) is usually mild with some days being very unsettled and rainy and others warm. At least part of September and early October in the East have warm and settled weather, but only in rare years is there an Indian summer where fine weather marks the entire traditional harvest season.

Demographics

Population

Ethnicity

Politics

Elections

In the 2015 general election there was an overall swing of 0.25% from the Conservatives to Labour and the Liberal Democrats lost 16% of its vote. All of Hertfordshire and Suffolk is now Conservative. The region's electorate voted 49% Conservative, 22% Labour, 16% UKIP, 8% Liberal Democrat and 4% Green. Like other regions, the division of seats favours the dominant party in the region and the Conservatives had 52, Labour 4 (Cambridge, Luton South, Luton North and Norwich South), UKIP 1 (Clacton) and 1 Liberal Democrat (North Norfolk).

Governance and regions

East of England Plan
The East of England Plan, a revision of the Regional Spatial Strategy for the East of England, was published on 12 May 2008. It was revoked on 3 January 2013.

Local government
The official region consists of the following subdivisions:

Eurostat NUTS
In the Eurostat Nomenclature of Territorial Units for Statistics (NUTS), the East of England was a level-1 NUTS region, coded "UKH", which was subdivided as follows:

After the UK's departure from the EU, the UK NUTS regions were renamed as International Territorial Level regions in 2021.

History

Civil War and the Protectorate
The East of England was a major force and resource for Parliament and, in particular, in the form of the Eastern Association. Oliver Cromwell came from Huntingdon.

Second World War
Norfolk, Suffolk and Essex played host to the American VIII Bomber Command and Ninth Air Force. The Imperial War Museum at Duxford has an exhibition, commemorating their participation and sacrifice, near to the M11 south of Cambridge.

Stansted Airport was RAF Stansted Mountfitchet, home to the 344th Bombardment Group. The de Havilland Mosquito was mainly assembled at Hatfield and Leavesden, although much of the innovative wooden structure originated outside the region from the furniture industry of High Wycombe; the Mosquito entered service in 1942 with 105 Sqn at RAF Horsham St Faith. RAF Tempsford in Bedford is the airfield from where SOE secret agents for Europe took off, with 138 Sqn which parachuted agents and equipment and 161 Sqn which landed and retrieved agents. 19 Sqn at Duxford was the first to be equipped with the Spitfire on 4 August 1938.

Cold War

The 81st Tactical Fighter Wing was at RAF Bentwaters from January 1952 and also at RAF Woodbridge; in the late 1980s some of the aircraft went to RAF Alconbury. Alconbury closed in 1992 and Bentwaters closed in 1993, with the American air forces being in the area for 42 years; the USAF aircraft subsequently moved to Spangdahlem Air Base in Rhineland-Palatinate, Germany.

At RAF Marham in west Norfolk, 214 Sqn with the Vickers Valiant developed the RAF's refuelling system; later the squadron would be equipped with the Handley Page Victor. Work on refuelling had also taken place at RAF Tarrant Rushton in Dorset.

From the 1950s, RAF Wyton was an important reconnaissance base for the RAF, mainly 543 Sqn. The base is now home of the Defence Intelligence Fusion Centre, previously known as JARIC, or the Joint Air Reconnaissance Intelligence Centre from 1956.

Healthcare

NHS East of England, which was the strategic health authority for the area until the abolition of these areas in 2013, is on Capital Park, next to Fulbourn Tesco, Fulbourn Hospital, and the Cambridge-Ipswich railway, on the eastern edge of Cambridge. The East of England Ambulance Service is on Cambourne Business Park on Cambourne, of the A428 (the former A45) west of Cambridge. The East Anglian Air Ambulance operates from Cambridge Airport and Norwich Airport; Essex Air Ambulance operates from Boreham.

Economy

The former electricity company for the area, Eastern Electricity, has the area's distribution now looked after by UK Power Networks at Fore Hamlet in Ipswich. UK Power Networks also looks after London and most of the South-East. Business Link in the East of England is next door to the headquarters of T-Mobile UK in Hatfield, at the roundabout of the A1057 and the A1001 on the Bishops Square Business Park. The region's Manufacturing Advisory Service is at Melbourn in Cambridgeshire, off the A10 and north of Royston. UK Trade & Investment for the region is in Histon with its international trade team based next to Magdalene College.

Hertfordshire

The Greater Watford area is home to British Waterways, Vinci (which bought Taylor Woodrow in 2008), the UK of the international firm Total Oil, retailers TK Maxx, Bathstore, Majestic Wine, Mothercare, Costco and Smiths Detection, Iveco, BrightHouse (at Abbots Langley), Leavesden Film Studios, Sanyo, Europcar, Olympus, Kenwood and Beko electronic goods manufacturers, Wetherspoons pub chains, the European HQ of the Hilton hotel group and Nestlé Waters; in Garston is the UK headquarters of the Seventh-day Adventist Church, on the A412 and the Building Research Establishment. Comet Group and Camelot Group (owners of the National Lottery), on the A4145, are in Rickmansworth. Ferrero (maker of Nutella and Kinder Chocolate) is in Croxley Green. Renault and Skanska (construction) are in Maple Cross.

Bedfordshire

Moto Hospitality has its headquarters at Toddington in Bedfordshire (at the Toddington services).

Luton is home to EasyJet,(based at the airport), Hain Celestial Group (which makes Linda McCartney Foods and is based on the B579 in Biscot), Eurolines (UK office), Thomson Holidays (based at Wigmore on the eastern edge of the town) and Chevrolet (at Griffin House, the Vauxhall head office). At the 85-acre Capability Green off the A1081 and junction 10a of the M1, is the Stonegate Pub Company (owner of Scream Pubs, Yates's, Slug and Lettuce and Hogshead), InBev UK (which bought most of Whitbread's beer brands), Chargemaster (electric vehicle network under the POLAR brand), AstraZeneca's UK Marketing Company division and Alexon Group (ladies clothing). Vauxhall produced its last Vauxhall Vectra in March 2002 at the plant near the A6/A505 roundabout, and now makes vans (Vivaro/Renault Trafic) at the former Bedford Vehicles plant, based in the north of the town at the GM Manufacturing Luton plant.

East Anglia

The economy in Norfolk, Cambridgeshire and Suffolk is traditionally mostly agricultural. Norfolk is the UK's biggest producer of potatoes. Nationally known companies include the RAC, Archant (publishing), Virgin Money and Aviva (formerly Norwich Union) in Norwich. In Carrow, to the east of the city, Colman's makes a wide range of mustards, and Britvic makes Robinsons squash, which was owned by Colman's until 1995. Across the River Yare near the A47/A146 junction in Trowse with Newton is May Gurney, the construction company. Bernard Matthews Farms has a large turkey farm on the former RAF Attlebridge in Weston Longville. Campbell Soup was made in Kings Lynn until 2008, and on the Hardwick Industrial Estate at the A47/A149 junction is PinguinLutosa the UK, which packs frozen vegetables, and Caithness Crystal.

Foster Refrigerator is the UK's leading manufacturer of commercial refrigerators and blast chillers, owned by Illinois Tool Works, based on the industrial estate; with Multitone Electronics, which has a manufacturing plant there, and which invented the pager in 1956, for St Thomas' Hospital; and Snap-on Diagnostics makes diagnostic tools for garages. British Sugar's Wissington is the world's largest sugar beet factory in Methwold, on the B1160 near the River Wissey. Lotus Cars and Team Lotus are on the eastern edge of the former RAF Hethel, east of Wymondham (A11) at Hethel (Bracon Ash). Jeyes Group makes household chemicals in Thetford, off the A134; Multiyork makes furniture and Baxter Healthcare has a manufacturing plant in the south of the town. Aunt Bessie vegetable products (roast potatoes) are made by Heinz at Westwick, in a factory built by Ross Group.

Around Cambridge on numerous science parks, are high technology (electronics and biochemistry) companies, such as ARM Holdings on Peterhouse Technology Park in the south-east of the town, Adder Technology (KVM switches) at Bar Hill at the A14/B1050 junction north of the town, Monsanto, Play.com on the Cambridge Business Centre. The Wellcome Trust Genome Campus has the European Bioinformatics Institute at Hinxton east of Duxford near the M11 spur for the A11. These form the so-called Silicon Fen. Marshall Aerospace is at Cambridge Airport on the A1303 in the east of the town, towards Teversham. South of the airport, Carl Zeiss NTS makes scanning electron microscopes in Cherry Hinton. Syngenta is to the east of Cambridge, on Capital Park at Fulbourn. Premier Foods has a large plant in Histon making Robertson's and Hartley's jam, Gale's honey, Smash instant potato, and Rose's marmalade. Addenbrooke's Hospital is a pioneering hospital in the UK, based at Cambridge Biomedical Campus.

Universities
The most famous university in the region is the University of Cambridge. The university has been officially rated as the best in the world in 2010. It has the second-best medicine course in the world, and in 2010 became the only university outside of the US to raise over £1 billion in charitable donations.

There are eight universities in the region. Cambridge hosts two universities: the University of Cambridge and Anglia Ruskin University. It is also the home of the Open University's East of England branch. Norwich also hosts two universities: the University of East Anglia and Norwich University of the Arts. There are also other towns and cities in the region which have universities including Bedford and Luton (University of Bedfordshire), Colchester (University of Essex) and Hatfield (University of Hertfordshire). Other higher education centres in the region include University Centre Peterborough, University of Suffolk and Writtle College.

.

The University of Cambridge receives almost three times as much funding as any other university in the region, due to its huge research grant—the largest in England (and the UK). The next largest, by funding, is UEA in Norwich. The University of Essex and Cranfield University also have moderately large research grants, but no other universities in the region do. The largest university by student numbers is ARU, and the next biggest is Cambridge. The smallest is Essex.

For total income to universities, Cambridge receives around £1 billion—around six times larger than any other university in the region. The University of Bedfordshire receives the least income. Cambridge has the lowest drop-out (discontinuation) rate in the region. Once graduated, over 50% of students stay in the region, with 25% going to London and 10% going to the South East. Very few go elsewhere—especially the North of England.

 University of Cambridge
 University of East Anglia
 University of Essex
 University of Hertfordshire
 Anglia Ruskin University
 University of Bedfordshire

Sport

Football
During the nineteenth century, several formulations of the laws of football, known as the Cambridge rules, were created by students at the University. One of these codes, dating from 1863, had a significant influence on the creation of the original laws of The Football Association.

East of England's top representatives in the English football league system today are Ipswich Town, Norwich City, Watford and Luton Town, who have competed in the top flight at various points. Alongside teams Peterborough United, and Cambridge United.

Literature
Children's author Dodie Smith lived near to the town of Sudbury in Suffolk, and part of her famous novel The Hundred and One Dalmatians which inspired the Disney animated film of the same name takes place in the town at St Peter's Church.

Media

Television
Much of the region receives the BBC East and ITV Anglia television services, both based in Norwich (the BBC moving from All Saints' Green to The Forum in 2003, and Anglia remaining at its original base, Angia House.) These services broadcast from the Sandy Heath. Sudbury and Tacolneston transmitter groups. Some areas in close proximity to London, including south Essex, may receive their service from BBC London and ITV London; in addition, the Hemel Hempstead relay transmitter is a relay of the London services from Crystal Palace, bringing London television into parts of Hertfordshire. Some editions of Look East and ITV News Anglia broadcast split news programming for the West (Home Counties) and East (East Anglia/Essex) of the region, with the West subregions broadcasting from Sandy Heath; the BBC's Western opt-outs are broadcast from studios in Cambridge, also the base of BBC Radio Cambridgeshire, whilst both versions of the ITV Anglia output have broadcast from Anglia House in Norwich since the split service was introduced in 1990.

Radio
 BBC Local Radio services in the region include stations for Cambridgeshire, Essex, Norfolk, Suffolk and Three Counties Radio, which serves Hertfordshire, Bedfordshire and Buckinghamshire. Radio Cambridgeshire previously broadcast some split programming specific to the Peterborough area - at one point broadcasting this under the BBC Radio Peterborough name - but this opt-out was withdrawn in 2012 as a cost-cutting measure.

See also
 East of England (European Parliament constituency)
 East of England Regional Strategy Board
 East of England Development Agency
 Regions of England
 East Anglia

Lists
 List of future transport developments in the East of England
 List of schools in the East of England

References

External links
Official visitor website for the East of England

 
Regions of England
Southern England
NUTS 1 statistical regions of England
NUTS 1 statistical regions of the European Union